A list of notable textbooks in thermodynamics and statistical mechanics, arranged by category and date.

Only or mainly thermodynamics

Both thermodynamics and statistical mechanics 

 
 2e Kittel, Charles; and Kroemer, Herbert (1980) New York: W.H. Freeman 
 2e (1988) Chichester: Wiley , .
 (1990) New York: Dover

Statistical mechanics 
 . 2e (1936) Cambridge: University Press; (1980) Cambridge University Press. 
 ; (1979) New York: Dover 
  Vol. 5 of the Course of Theoretical Physics. 3e (1976) Translated by J.B. Sykes and M.J. Kearsley (1980) Oxford : Pergamon Press. 
 . 3e (1995) Oxford: Butterworth-Heinemann 
 . 2e (1987) New York: Wiley 
 . 2e (1988) Amsterdam: North-Holland . 2e (1991) Berlin: Springer Verlag , 
 ; (2005) New York: Dover 
 
2e (2000) Sausalito, Calif.: University Science 

 
2e (1998) Chichester: Wiley

Specialized topics

Kinetic theory 
  Vol. 10 of the Course of Theoretical Physics (3rd Ed). Translated by J.B. Sykes and R.N. Franklin (1981) London: Pergamon ,

Quantum statistical mechanics

Mathematics of statistical mechanics 

 Translated by G. Gamow (1949) New York: Dover 
 . Reissued (1974), (1989); (1999) Singapore: World Scientific 
; (1984) Cambridge: University Press . 2e (2004) Cambridge: University Press

Miscellaneous
 
(available online here)

Historical
  (1896, 1898) Translated by Stephen G. Brush (1964) Berkeley: University of California Press; (1995) New York: Dover 
 
 Translated by J. Kestin (1956) New York: Academic Press.
  German Encyclopedia of Mathematical Sciences. Translated by Michael J. Moravcsik (1959) Ithaca: Cornell University Press; (1990) New York: Dover

See also

List of textbooks on classical mechanics and quantum mechanics
List of textbooks in electromagnetism
List of books on general relativity

Further reading

References

External links 
 Statistical Mechanics and Thermodynamics Texts Clark University curriculum development project

Lists of science textbooks
 
Mathematics-related lists
Physics-related lists
 
Textbooks
Textbooks